The 2003 Wake Forest Demon Deacons football team was an American football team that represented Wake Forest University during the 2003 NCAA Division I-A football season. In their third season under head coach Jim Grobe, the Demon Deacons compiled a 5–7 record and finished in seventh place in the Atlantic Coast Conference.

Schedule

Team leaders

References

Wake Forest
Wake Forest Demon Deacons football seasons
Wake Forest Demon Deacons football